Sedani are a type of pasta slightly larger than macaroni, with a similar slight bend. They can be smooth (lisce) or furrowed (rigati).

Initially named zanne d'elefante (litt. "elephant tusks"), they were renamed sedani (from sedano, meaning "celery") after the trade of ivory was banned.

Notes and references

Neapolitan cuisine
Types of pasta